Jennifer Kaytin Robinson (born April 4, 1988) is an American director, producer, and writer. She is best known for creating the MTV show Sweet/Vicious,  the Netflix film Someone Great (2019), and co-writing Marvel Studios's Thor: Love and Thunder alongside Taika Waititi. Robinson's film Do Revenge (2022) starring Camila Mendes and Maya Hawke, is described as "a subverted dark comedy."

Biography 
Jennifer Kaytin Robinson was born and raised in Miami, Florida. At 16 she moved to Los Angeles and reached the final round of auditions of Hannah Montana to play Miley Cyrus's best friend. After acting and working in Fashion PR between New York and Los Angeles, Robinson turned to writing.

She created and produced the MTV show Sweet/Vicious, which premiered in 2016. Sweet/Vicious was a dark comedy about two female college students who become vigilantes and take justice into their own hands taking revenge on sexual abusers. The show delicately balanced heightened genre and superhero elements and its nuanced portrayal of survivors. The show was critically acclaimed and ran for one season before being cancelled. Variety named Sweet/Vicious one of their 20 Best New Shows of 2016. A Sweet/Vicious comic book written by Robinson was announced in 2018.

In 2016 Robinson was named as one of Variety‘s 10 TV Writers to Watch. She was invited to speak at the White House under the Obama administration and Vice President Biden's final "It's On Us Summit."

In 2018, it was announced that Robinson would make her feature directorial debut for Netflix with Someone Great. Gina Rodriguez attached to star and produce in the romantic comedy alongside producers Paul Feig, Jessie Henderson, and Likely Story. Written by Robinson the story was "described as being about loss, growing up and, above all, the everlasting bond of female friendships." Brittany Snow, DeWanda Wise, and Lakeith Stanfield were also cast. Filming began in April 2018 in New York City. Someone Great premiered on Netflix on April 19, 2019.

In 2020, Variety reported the Robinson had been hired to co-write Marvel Studios's Thor: Love and Thunder with director Taika Waititi. Robinson also received screenplay credit on HBO Max's Unpregnant released in 2020.

She is set to write, direct and executive produce a Center Stage television series. Robinson served as a Consulting Producer on the Marvel Studios and Disney+ show Hawkeye.

Robinson directed and co-wrote the film Do Revenge, starring Camila Mendes and Maya Hawke, a high school comedy version of Strangers on a Train. The film premiered on Netflix in September 2022.

Filmography
Film

Television

See also
 List of female film and television directors
 List of LGBT-related films directed by women

References

External links 
 

American women film directors
American women film producers
American women screenwriters
Living people
1988 births
Writers from Miami
Film directors from Florida
Film producers from Florida
Screenwriters from Florida
21st-century American screenwriters
21st-century American women writers